Cape Cod Museum of Art is an art museum in the town of Dennis in Barnstable County, Massachusetts, United States in the center of the region Cape Cod.

References

External links
 Cape Cod Museum of Art, official website

Art museums and galleries in Massachusetts
Dennis, Massachusetts
Museums in Barnstable County, Massachusetts